Vasantrao Shrinivas Sinai Dempo (4 February 1916 – 9 November 2000 ) was an Indian industrialist and philanthropist from Goa, who founded the Dempo Group of Industries. The mining business he founded in 1941 has now grown to include interests in shipbuilding, minerals, foods, iron and steel, education, travels and construction. He was the founder of the Dempo S.C., a popular football club based in Goa, which he nurtured after acquiring the local club, Bicholim SC. Vasantrao Dempo Reflective Chair, an endowment professorship at the Tepper School of Business of the Carnegie Mellon University is named after him and is funded by the endowment of Dempo Group. Dempo Charities Trust, the philanthropic arm of the Group runs several educational institutions in Goa. The Government of India awarded him the fourth highest civilian honour of the Padma Shri in 1991.

On 4 March 2016, a commemorative postage stamp was released in his honour.

References 

Recipients of the Padma Shri in trade and industry
Businesspeople from Goa
Indian industrialists
Dempo SC
People from Panaji
1916 births
2000 deaths
20th-century Indian philanthropists